Gordon is an unincorporated community in Butler County, Kansas, United States.

History
A post office existed in Gordon from June 30, 1884, to June 30, 1936.

Gordon was a station on the Atchison, Topeka and Santa Fe Railway.

Education
The community is served by Augusta USD 402 public school district.

Notable people
 Tom Sturdivant, baseball player.
 Rosalie E. Wahl, Minnesota Supreme Court justice, was born in Gordon.

References

Further reading

External links
 Butler County maps: Current, Historic, KDOT

Unincorporated communities in Butler County, Kansas
Unincorporated communities in Kansas